Near to Earth is a 1913 American silent drama film directed by  D. W. Griffith.

Cast
 Lionel Barrymore as Gato
 Robert Harron as Gato's Brother
 Gertrude Bambrick as Gato's Sweetheart
 Mae Marsh as One of Gato's Sweetheart's Friends
 Kathleen Butler as One of Gato's Sweetheart's Friends
 Walter Miller as The Stranger
 Dorothy Bernard
 Christy Cabanne as A Businessman
 Harry Carey
 Donald Crisp
 Charles Hill Mailes
 Joseph McDermott as A Businessman
 Mabel Normand
 Frank Opperman as A Friend
 Wallace Reid
 Blanche Sweet

See also
 Harry Carey filmography
 D. W. Griffith filmography
 Blanche Sweet filmography
 Lionel Barrymore filmography
 Wallace Reid filmography

References

External links

1913 films
1913 drama films
1913 short films
Silent American drama films
American silent short films
American black-and-white films
Biograph Company films
Films directed by D. W. Griffith
1910s American films